Ivan Sergeyevich Smetanin (born 26 March 1996) is a Russian football player.

Club career
He made his debut in the Russian Football National League for FC Tyumen on 22 March 2017 in a game against PFC Spartak Nalchik.

References

External links
 Profile by Russian Football National League

1996 births
Living people
Russian footballers
FC Tyumen players
Association football defenders